Foreign Devil is a 1999 young adult horror novel by Christine Harris. It follows the story of Tyler Norton who is abducted by pirates from the past and faces a bid for freedom.

Background
Foreign Devil was first published in Australia in 1999 by Random House in trade paperback format. It won the 1999 Aurealis Award for best horror novel and a travel grant from the Department for the Arts and Cultural Development.

References

External links

1999 Australian novels
Australian horror novels
Novels about pirates
Aurealis Award-winning works